Fernando Lopes, GCIH (28 December 1935 – 2 May 2012) was a Portuguese film director.  He was a Film teacher at the Portuguese National Conservatory, nowadays the Lisbon Theatre and Film School (Escola Superior de Teatro e Cinema). He died, aged 76, in Lisbon  due to throat cancer.

Filmography

Pedras e o Tempo, As (1961)
Voo da Amizade, O (1962)
Palavras e os Fios, As (1962)
Rota do Progresso (1964)
Belarmino (1964)
Se Deus Quiser (1966)
Cruzeiro do Sul (1966)
Hoje à Estreia (1967)
Tejo na Rota do Progresso (1967)
Vermelho, Amarelo e Verde (1969)
Nacionalidade: Português (1972)
A Aventura Calculada (1972)
Era Uma Vez... Amanhã (1972)
Uma Abelha na Chuva (1972)
Encoberto, O (1975)
Cantigamente (1 episode, 1976)
Nós por cá Todos Bem (1978)
Lisboa (1979) (TV)
Crónica dos Bons Malandros (1984)
Matar Saudades (1988)
Fio do Horizonte, O (1993)
Gérard, Fotógrafo (1998) (TV)
Cinema (2001)
Delfim, O (2002) aka Dauphin, Le (France)
Lá Fora (2004)
98 Octanas (2006)

References

External links

1935 births
2012 deaths
Portuguese film directors
Deaths from esophageal cancer